Kaukajärvi is a district in Tampere, Finland, located between the Highway 9 (E63) and the three-kilometer-long Lake Kaukajärvi, where district gets its name. The district is also located right on the border of the Kangasala town.

Construction of the Kaukajärvi suburb began in the 1960s, the first in the city. The Kaukajärvi statistical area had 12,326 inhabitants in 2017.

Kaukajärvi has an international school called Kaukajärvi School founded in 1969, which provides education for grades 1–10.

See also
 Haihara
 Hervanta

References

Districts of Tampere